Patrick Kwame Ampadu (born 20 December 1970) is an Irish former footballer who played as a midfielder. Ampadu featured for clubs Arsenal, Swansea City, Leyton Orient and Exeter City in his playing career. He is currently an assistant coach for Columbus Crew under Wilfried Nancy. He previously was an assistant coach for Monaco. Ampadu also played for the Republic of Ireland's U21 team.

Early life
Ampadu was born in Bradford, West Yorkshire, England, to an Irish mother and Ghanaian father. Ampadu subsequently moved with his parents to Dublin, Ireland, where he was raised. He undertook his primary and secondary education at O'Connell's School in Dublin where his schoolmates included future footballer Jeff Kenna. At a young age he took up the sport of hurling but thereafter found himself to be quite proficient at football as well.

Playing career

Ampadu first played in Irish youth football for Sherrard United and Belvedere before joining Arsenal in July 1988.
His debut came in a 3–1 win away to Derby County on 24 March 1990. He went on to have loan spells at Plymouth Argyle and West Bromwich Albion the following season, before making a permanent move to the latter in June 1991.

Ampadu spent three years at West Bromwich Albion before moving to Swansea City in February 1994. He played in Swansea City's 1994 Football League Trophy win at Wembley. He also reached the 1997 Football League Third Division play-off Final with the Swans. He moved to Leyton Orient in May 1998 making 72 League appearances in two seasons but missing the Third Division play-offs in 1998–99 through injury. He then had a spell at Exeter City where he scored twice against Swindon Town in the League Cup and Dagenham & Redbridge in the league. In January 2005 he played in Exeter's memorable 0–0 draw at Old Trafford in the FA Cup. Ampadu then had stints with Newport County and Tiverton Town where his playing days eventually came to an end in 2006.

Managerial career
Ampadu returned to Exeter to be a part of the club's coaching outfit. He took up the role in July 2008 within the club's academy, to be at the helm of the Grecians Under 18 side. He moved to Arsenal in 2012 to become the Under 14s coach at the London side's Hale End Academy.

Personal life
Ampadu's son Ethan is a footballer who plays for Chelsea and Wales. The younger Ampadu, at the age of 15 years and 10 months, made his debut for Exeter City in a League Cup tie against Brentford on 9 August 2016, breaking an 87-year-old record set by Cliff Bastin.

Honours

Player
Swansea City
 Football League Trophy: 1993–94
 Football League Third Division play-offs runner-up: 1997

Managerial
Arsenal
 U18 Premier League: Runner-up 2016–17

References

External links

1970 births
Living people
Irish people of Ghanaian descent
Irish sportspeople of African descent
Black Irish sportspeople
Footballers from Bradford
Republic of Ireland association footballers
Association football midfielders
Belvedere F.C. players
Arsenal F.C. players
Plymouth Argyle F.C. players
West Bromwich Albion F.C. players
Swansea City A.F.C. players
Leyton Orient F.C. players
Exeter City F.C. players
Newport County A.F.C. players
Tiverton Town F.C. players
English Football League players
Republic of Ireland expatriate association footballers
Irish expatriate sportspeople in England
Expatriate footballers in England
Republic of Ireland under-21 international footballers
Association football coaches
Exeter City F.C. non-playing staff
Arsenal F.C. non-playing staff
AS Monaco FC non-playing staff
CF Montréal non-playing staff
Irish expatriate sportspeople in Monaco
Irish expatriate sportspeople in Canada